The  Apollo 11 lunar sample display  is a commemorative podium style plaque display consisting of four dust particle specimens (dubbed "Moon rocks"), the recipient's flag and two small metal plates attached with descriptive messages. The Apollo 11 plaques were given as gifts in 1970 by President Richard Nixon to 135 countries, the 50 states of the United States and its territories, and the United Nations.

History and description 
  With the exception of Venezuela, whose actual flag was not flown to the Moon on Apollo 11, the wording on the plaque (with the appropriate name filled in) was:

Fate 

The New York Times reported in 2012 that gifts of moon rocks were not well tracked or managed by NASA. Within the US, public gifts require legislation to be transferred, but other nations set their own laws. Some samples of lunar dust soil from the Apollo 11 and lunar basalt 70017 from the later Apollo 17 missions have been reported missing. Since 2005 entities and people have made concerted efforts to find the displays. Joseph Gutheinz, a former NASA Office of Inspector General special agent and a professor who teaches an online course at the University of Phoenix, had his students try to locate the displays. Robert Pearlman of collectSPACE has also tracked the displays.

See also
 Apollo 17 lunar sample display
 List of Apollo lunar sample displays

References 

Apollo program lunar sample displays
Apollo 11
Lunar samples
Foreign relations of the United States